Zygaspis nigra is a worm lizard species in the family Amphisbaenidae. The species is endemic to southern Africa.

Geographic range
Z. nigra is found in Angola, Botswana, the Caprivi strip, and Zambia.

Habitat
The preferred habitat of Z. nigra is woodland on sandy soil.

Description
It is colored black and white, with a speckled or marbled appearance. It is more blackish dorsally, and is more whitish ventrally. The snout is rounded.

Reproduction
Z. nigra is oviparous.

References

Further reading
Broadley DG, Gans C (1969). "A new species of Zygaspis (Amphisbaenia: Reptilia) from Zambia and Angola". Arnoldia (Rhodesia) 4 (25): 1-4. (Zygaspis niger, new species).
Broadley, Donald G.; Broadley, Sheila (1997). "A revision of the African genus Zygaspis Cope (Reptilia: Amphisbaenia)". Syntarsus 4: 1-24. (Zygaspis nigra, corrected gender of specific name).
Measy, G. John; Tolley, Krystal A. (2013). "A molecular phylogeny for sub-Saharan amphisbaenians". African Journal of Herpetology 62 (2): 100-108.

Zygaspis
Reptiles of Zambia
Reptiles of Angola
Reptiles of Namibia
Reptiles of Botswana
Reptiles described in 1969
Taxa named by Donald George Broadley
Taxa named by Carl Gans